Iratoșu is a commune in Arad County, Romania, on the Arad Plateau, at the western border of Romania. The commune stretches over 3,770 hectares and is composed of three villages: Iratoșu (situated at 22 km from Arad), Variașu Mare (Nagyvarjas), and Variașu Mic (Kisvarjaspuszta).

Population
According to the last census, the population of the commune counts 2361 inhabitants, out of which 41,7% are Romanians, 55,1% Hungarians, 2,4% Roms, 0,3% Germans, 0,3% Ukrainians, and 0,2% are of other or undeclared nationalities.

History
The first documentary record of Iratoșu dates back to 1446. Variașu Mic was attested documentarily in 1913, while Variașu Mare was in 1446.

Economy
The commune's present-day economy can be characterized by a powerful dynamic force with significant developments in all the sectors present in the commune.

Tourism
Variașu Mic is also a frontier crossing point. Situated on a plateau, the natural touristic fond of the commune is not abundant in spectacular sights.

References

Communes in Arad County
Localities in Crișana